Thunderbolt Peak is a peak in the Palisades group of peaks in the Sierra Nevada in the U.S. state of California. But if it is considered a separate mountain peak, Thunderbolt Peak is the northernmost fourteener in the Sierra Nevada.

The first ascent was attempted by a party of very well-known climbers. During the climb, a lightning bolt struck very close to Jules Eichorn, breaking his concentration. The mountain was named in commemoration of this event.

See also
 The Palisades of the Sierra Nevada
 Beinn a' Bheithir (A Scottish hill whose Gaelic name translates as Thunderbolt Peak)

References

External links
 

Mountains of Kings Canyon National Park
Mountains of the John Muir Wilderness
Mountains of Fresno County, California
Mountains of Inyo County, California
Mountains of Northern California